The Nitschkiaceae are a family of fungi in the Ascomycota, order Coronophorales. Species in the family are mostly saprobic on wood, although some grow on lichens.

Genera
This is a list of the genera in the Nitschkiaceae, based on a 2021 review and summary of fungal classification by Wijayawardene and colleagues. Following the genus name is the taxonomic authority (those who first circumscribed the genus; standardized author abbreviations are used), year of publication, and the number of species:
Acanthonitschkea  – 10 spp.
Biciliosporina  – 1 sp.
Botryola  – 1 sp.
Fracchiaea  – 35 spp.
Groenhiella  – 1 sp.
Janannfeldtia  – 1 sp.
Lasiosphaeriopsis  – 7 spp.
Loranitschkia  – 1 sp.
Neochaetosphaerella  – 4 spp.
Nitschkia  – 66 spp.
Rhagadostoma  – 7 spp.
Rhagadostomella  – 1 sp.
Tortulomyces  – 1 sp.

Species Fungorum also lists Sydowinula moravica  Nitschkiaceae.

References

Coronophorales
Ascomycota families
Taxa described in 1932
Taxa named by John Axel Nannfeldt